Argyle is an unincorporated community in Logan County, West Virginia, United States, along Rum Creek.

Unincorporated communities in Logan County, West Virginia
Unincorporated communities in West Virginia